Special functions are particular mathematical functions that have more or less established names and notations due to their importance in mathematical analysis, functional analysis, geometry, physics, or other applications.

The term is defined by consensus, and thus lacks a general formal definition, but the list of mathematical functions contains functions that are commonly accepted as special.

Tables of special functions
Many special functions appear as solutions of differential equations or integrals of elementary functions. Therefore, tables of integrals usually include descriptions of special functions, and tables of special functions include most important integrals; at least, the integral representation of special functions. Because symmetries of differential equations are essential to both physics and mathematics, the theory of special functions is closely related to the theory of Lie groups and Lie algebras, as well as certain topics in mathematical physics.

Symbolic computation engines usually recognize the majority of special functions.

Notations used for special functions
Functions with established international notations are the sine, cosine, exponential function, and error function ( or ).

Some special functions have several notations:

 The Bessel functions may be denoted
 
 
 

Subscripts are often used to indicate arguments, typically integers. In a few cases, the semicolon or even backslash (\) is used as a separator. In this case, the translation to algorithmic languages admits ambiguity and may lead to confusion.

Superscripts may indicate not only exponentiation, but modification of a function. Examples (particularly with trigonometric and hyperbolic functions) include:

  usually means 
  is typically , but never 
  usually means , not ; this one typically causes the most confusion, since the meaning of this superscript is inconsistent with the others.

Evaluation of special functions
Most special functions are considered as a function of a complex variable. They are analytic; the singularities and cuts are described; the differential and integral representations are known and the expansion to the Taylor series or asymptotic series are available. In addition, sometimes there exist relations with other special functions; a complicated special function can be expressed in terms of simpler functions. Various representations can be used for the evaluation;  the simplest way to evaluate a function is to expand it into a Taylor series. However, such representation may converge slowly or not at all. In algorithmic languages, rational approximations are typically used, although they may behave badly in the case of complex argument(s).

History of special functions

Classical theory
While trigonometry can be codified—as was clear already to expert mathematicians of the eighteenth century (if not before)—the search for a complete and unified theory of special functions has continued since the nineteenth century. The high point of special function theory in 1800–1900 was the theory of elliptic functions; treatises that were essentially complete, such as that of Tannery and Molk, could be written as handbooks to all the basic identities of the theory. They were based on techniques from complex analysis.

From that time onward it would be assumed that analytic function theory, which had already unified the trigonometric and exponential functions, was a fundamental tool. The end of the century also saw a very detailed discussion of spherical harmonics.

Changing and fixed motivations
Of course the wish for a broad theory including as many as possible of the known special functions has its intellectual appeal, but it is worth noting other motivations.  For a long time, the special functions were in the particular province of applied mathematics; applications to the physical sciences and engineering determined the relative importance of functions. In the days before the electronic computer, the ultimate compliment to a special function was the computation, by hand, of extended tables of its values. This was a capital-intensive process, intended to make the function available by look-up, as for the familiar logarithm tables. The aspects of the theory that then mattered might then be two:

 for numerical analysis, discovery of infinite series or other analytical expression allowing rapid calculation; and
 reduction of as many functions as possible to the given function.

In contrast, one might say, there are approaches typical of the interests of pure mathematics: asymptotic analysis, analytic continuation and monodromy in the complex plane, and the discovery of symmetry principles and other structure behind the façade of endless formulae in rows.  There is not a real conflict between these approaches, in fact.

Twentieth century
The twentieth century saw several waves of interest in special function theory.  The classic Whittaker and Watson (1902) textbook sought to unify the theory by using complex variables; the G. N. Watson tome A Treatise on the Theory of Bessel Functions pushed the techniques as far as possible for one important type that particularly admitted asymptotics to be studied.

The later Bateman Manuscript Project, under the editorship of Arthur Erdélyi, attempted to be encyclopedic, and came around the time when electronic computation was coming to the fore and tabulation ceased to be the main issue.

Contemporary theories
The modern theory of orthogonal polynomials is of a definite but limited scope. Hypergeometric series, observed by Felix Klein to be important in astronomy and mathematical physics, became an intricate theory, in need of later conceptual arrangement. Lie groups, and in particular their representation theory, explain what a spherical function can be in general; from 1950 onwards substantial parts of classical theory could be recast in terms of Lie groups. Further,  work on algebraic combinatorics also revived interest in older parts of the theory. Conjectures of Ian G. Macdonald helped to open up large and active new fields with the typical special function flavour. Difference equations have begun to take their place besides differential equations as a source for special functions.

Special functions in number theory
In number theory, certain special functions have traditionally been studied, such as particular Dirichlet series and modular forms. Almost all aspects of special function theory are reflected there, as well as some new ones, such as came out of the monstrous moonshine theory.

Special functions of matrix arguments
Analogues of several special functions have been defined on the space of positive definite matrices, among them the power function which goes back to Atle Selberg, the multivariate gamma function, and types of Bessel functions.

The NIST Digital Library of Mathematical Functions has a section covering several special functions of matrix arguments.

Researchers

George Andrews
Richard Askey
Harold Exton
George Gasper
Wolfgang Hahn
Mizan Rahman
Mourad E. H. Ismail
Tom Koornwinder
Waleed Al-Salam
Dennis Stanton
Theodore S. Chihara
James A. Wilson
Erik Koelink
Eric Rains
Arpad Baricz

See also
 List of mathematical functions
 List of special functions and eponyms
 Elementary function

References

Bibliography

External links
National Institute of Standards and Technology, United States Department of Commerce. NIST Digital Library of Mathematical Functions. Archived from the original on December 13, 2018.
 
 Online calculator, Online scientific calculator with over 100 functions (>=32 digits, many complex) (German language)
 Special functions at EqWorld: The World of Mathematical Equations
 Special functions and polynomials by Gerard 't Hooft and Stefan Nobbenhuis (April 8, 2013)
 Numerical Methods for Special Functions, by A. Gil, J. Segura, N.M. Temme (2007).
 R. Jagannathan, (P,Q)-Special Functions
 Specialfunctionswiki

 
History of mathematics